Louis Montoyer (1747, Mariemont, Austrian Netherlands, now Belgium – 5 June 1811, Vienna) was an 18th-century Belgian-Austrian architect, principally active in Brussels and Vienna.

Life
He worked in Brussels as an architect and building contractor from 1778 onwards. Although he has been credited as the architect of the Royal Palace of Laeken (for Prince Albert of Saxony, Duke of Teschen and his wife Archduchess Maria-Christina), later research made clear he was merely executing the designs of other architects such as Charles de Wailly.  In 1795 he came to Vienna with Prince Albert of Saxony, Duke of Teschen, who had already appointed him his court architect in 1780.  There he first worked on rebuilding the duke's palace, now known as the Albertina.  He also built the Ceremonial Hall at the Hofburg, connecting the Leopoldian part of the building with the old Imperial Palace.  Also in Vienna, Montoyer built the Palais Rasumofsky for the former Russian ambassador Andrey Razumovsky.

On 25 September 1805 he was made an honorary citizen of Vienna, and in 1807 he was appointed court architect to Francis II.  He was buried in the St. Marx Cemetery, where his memorial can still be seen.

Works

Belgium

Théâtre Royal du Parc (1782)
Supervision of the building of the Royal Palace of Laeken after the plans of Charles de Wailly (1782–84)
Church of Saint Jacques-sur-Coudenberg in Brussels
The Orangery of the Chateau de Seneffe (1782)
Designs for an extension of Église Saint-Joseph de Waterloo (1789)

Vienna
Renovation and extension of the Albertina (1801–04)
Redoute Baden, (1801, demolished in 1908)
Hall of Ceremonies at the Hofburg Imperial Palace (1801–02)
Rebuilding of the Hofburg Chapel (1802)
Extension of the Churhaus (1806)
Transformation of the Malteserkirche (1806–1808)
Palais Rasumofsky, 1806–1807

External links 
  Louis Montoyer on aeiou
  Louis Montoyer on the Bezirksmuseum Landstraße site

Architects of the Austrian Netherlands
1749 births
1811 deaths